Ambatalawa may refer to:

 Ambatalawa (6°58'N 80°30'E), a village in Sri Lanka
 Ambatalawa (7°2'N 80°40'E), a village in Sri Lanka